"Gardenia" is a song by American rock band Kyuss. It was released in 1995 as the second single from their third studio album, Welcome to Sky Valley (1994). It was written by the band's drummer, Brant Bjork.

Accolades

Track listing
Europe CD
 "Gardenia" - 6:53
 "Un Sandpiper" - 8:16
 "Conan Troutman" (Live at the Marquee Club; produced by Hutch) - 2:18

Personnel
John Garcia - vocals
Josh Homme - guitar
Scott Reeder - bass
Brant Bjork - drums
Chris Goss - producer
Joe Barresi - engineering, mixing

References

External links
 

Kyuss songs
1994 songs
1995 singles